Nong Hong is a district (amphoe) in the western part of Buriram province, northeastern Thailand.

Geography
Neighboring districts are (from the northeast clockwise) Lam Plai Mat, Chamni, Nong Ki of Buriram Province, Chakkarat and Huai Thalaeng of Nakhon Ratchasima province.

History
The minor district (king amphoe) was created on 31 March 1981, when the three tambons Sa Kaeo, Huai Hin, and Thai Samakkhi were split off from Lam Plai Mat district. It was upgraded to a full district on 1 January 1988.

Motto
The Nong Hong District's motto is "The city of best beef, Shallots, Maeung Fai's ancient city, have many teal and excellent tradition."

Administration
The district is divided into seven sub-districts (tambons), which are further subdivided into 100 villages (mubans). Nong Hong is a township (thesaban tambon) which covers parts of tambon Sa Kaeo. There are also seven tambon administrative organizations (TAO).

References

External links
amphoe.com

Nong Hong